The Piazza de' Rucellai is a piazza in Florence, Italy, home to the Palazzo Rucellai and its loggia, both designed by Leon Battista Alberti. It is a small triangular square.

Rucellai, Piazza de'